Batavia Township is a civil township of Branch County in the U.S. state of Michigan.  As of the 2010 census, the township's population was 1,339.

Communities
The township is primarily agricultural. There are no incorporated municipalities, although the city of Coldwater lies just east of the township. There are only two unincorporated communities within the township: 
It was settled in 1832.

Geography

Demographics
As of the census of 2000, there were 1,546 people, 588 households, and 429 families residing in the township. There were 651 housing units at an average density of 18.2 per square mile (7.0/km2). The racial makeup of the township was 97.28% White, 0.91% African American, 0.13% Native American, 0.06% Asian, 0.65% from other races, and 0.97% from two or more races. Hispanic or Latino of any race were 1.62% of the population.

There were 588 households, out of which 32.8% had children under the age of 18 living with them, 59.0% were married couples living together, 8.2% had a female householder with no husband present, and 26.9% were non-families. 22.3% of all households were made up of individuals, and 9.7% had someone living alone who was 65 years of age or older.  The average household size was 2.61 and the average family size was 3.03.

In the township the population was spread out, with 25.1% under the age of 18, 8.3% from 18 to 24, 27.6% from 25 to 44, 24.9% from 45 to 64, and 14.2% who were 65 years of age or older.  The median age was 39 years. For every 100 females, there were 102.9 males.  For every 100 females age 18 and over, there were 100.3 males.

The median income for a household in the township was $41,351, and the median income for a family was $46,667. Males had a median income of $33,542 versus $21,806 for females. The per capita income for the township was $18,526.  About 5.5% of families and 9.4% of the population were below the poverty line, including 11.2% of those under age 18 and 14.9% of those age 65 or over.

References

Notes

Sources

Townships in Branch County, Michigan
Townships in Michigan